Cannabis flower essential oil, also known as hemp essential oil, is an essential oil obtained by steam distillation from the flowers, panicles (flower cluster), stem, and upper leaves of the hemp plant (Cannabis sativa L.). Hemp essential oil is distinct from hemp seed oil (hemp oil) and hash oil: the former is a vegetable oil that is cold-pressed from the seeds of low-THC varieties of hemp, the latter is a THC-rich extract of dried female hemp flowers (marijuana) or resin (hashish).

A pale yellow liquid, cannabis flower essential oil is a volatile oil that is a mixture of monoterpenes, sesquiterpenes, and other terpenoid compounds. The typical scent of hemp results from about 140 different terpenoids. The essential oil is manufactured from both low-THC ("fibre-type") and high-THC ("drug-type") varieties of hemp. As most of the phytocannabinoids are nearly insoluble in water, hemp essential oil contains only traces of cannabinoids. Even in "drug-type" hemp, the THC content of the essential oil does not exceed 0.08%. Most of the material is produced in Canada, as well as small scale cultivations in Switzerland and Germany. 

Hemp essential oil is used as a scent in perfumes, cosmetics, soaps, and candles. It is also used as a flavoring in foods, primarily candy and beverages.

Yield 
The yield depends on the hemp type (drug, fiber) and pollination; sex, age, and part of the plant; cultivation (indoor, outdoor etc.); harvest time and conditions; drying; and storage. For example, fresh buds from an Afghani variety yielded 0.29% essential oil. Drying and storage reduced the content from 0.29% to 0.20% after 1 week, and to 0.13% after 3 months. Monoterpenes showed a significantly greater loss than sesquiterpenes, but none of the major components completely disappeared in the drying process.

About 1.3 L of essential oil per ton resulted from freshly harvested outdoor-grown hemp, corresponding to about 10 L/ha. The yield of nonpollinated ("sinsemilla") hemp at 18 L/ha was more than twofold compared with pollinated hemp (8 L/ha).

Constituents
Sixty-eight components were detected by GC and GC/mass spectrometry (MS) in fresh bud oil distilled from high-potency, indoor-grown hemp. The 57 identified constituents were 92% monoterpenes, 7% sesquiterpenes, and approx. 1% other compounds (ketones, esters). The dominating monoterpenes were myrcene (67%) and limonene (16%). 

In the essential oil from outdoor-grown hemp, the monoterpene concentration varied between 47.9 and 92.1% of the total terpenoid content. The sesquiterpenes ranged from 5.2 to 48.6%. The most abundant monoterpene was β-myrcene, followed by trans-caryophyllene, α-pinene, trans-ocimene, and α-terpinolene.

Another report said there were 140 terpenoids, dominated by  α-pinene and limonene which together often comprise 75% of the live plant's volatiles. However, extracted essential oils can change in composition, and the live plant, dried plant and essential oil can smell rather different.

Even in "drug-type" hemp, the THC content of the essential oil was not more than 0.08%.

In the essential oil of five different European hemp cultivars, the dominating terpenes were myrcene (21.1–35.0 %), α-pinene (7.2–14.6 %), α-terpinolene (7.0–16.6 %), trans-caryophyllene (12.2.–18.9 %), and α-humulene (6.1–8.7 %). The main differences between the cultivars were found in the contents of α-terpinolene and α-pinene.

Other terpenoids present only in traces are sabinene, α-terpinene, 1,8-cineole (eucalyptol), pulegone, γ-terpinene, terpineol-4-ol, bornyl acetate, α-copaene, alloaromadendrene, viridiflorene, β-bisabolene, γ-cadinene, trans-β-farnesene, trans-nerolidol, and β-bisabolol.

The major alkane present in an essential oil obtained by extraction and steam distillation was the n-C29 alkane nonacosane (55.8 and 10.7%, respectively).

Uses
The various terpenes in cannabis have antifungal, antimicrobial, antiviral and insect repellent functions that could be commercially valuable when used externally. 

Cannabis essential oils that are cannabinoid-free have been tested for central nervous effects. Natural monoterpenes and sesquiterpenes from cannabis flowers have relaxing, sedative and anti-depressant effects when inhaled. Their application in aromatherapy is increasing, but the high price of the natural oil (50$ per milliliter) is a limiting factor.

In Switzerland and Austria, specific landraces with high essential oil content but no discernible amounts of cannabinoids have been developed for the purpose of flavoring beverage products. For those applications, oils with high monoterpene percentages (but a low alpha-humulene or caryophyllene oxide concentration) are desirable.

Terpenes used in THC vaping products, legal in some jurisdictions in the United States, are not true cannabis terpenes, but synthetic and racemic with potential health hazards. Due to health promoting effects, natural THC-free cannabis flower oil is the preferred ingredient in the legal European market. Unregulated additives in US vaping products have led to serious health consequences, including fatal outcomes.

See also
 Cannabis concentrate
 Cannabidiol

References

Sources

Further reading
 – discusses similar terpenes in hops and cannabis

External links

Hemp Essential Oil: Sweet Smell of Success

Essential oils
Preparations of cannabis